The National Council for Human Rights (NCHR) is an Egyptian human rights organization established in 2003 with a mission of promoting and maintaining human rights in Egypt. The NCHR publishes annual reports concerning the current status of human rights within the country. Former UN Secretary General Boutros Boutros-Ghali played a "significant role" in creating the organization, and served as its president until 2012. In 2012, during the brief one year reign of the Muslim Brotherhood Hossam El Gheriany. a senior Islamist judge was appointed as the head of the NCHR, however after the 2013 uprising and the subsequent military overthrow of Mohamed Morsi Gheriany was removed and the entire council was recomposed and Mohamed Fayek was appointed as the new President. In 2021 after the term of NCHR members expired, The Parliament of Egypt nominated Moushira Khattab to become the new president of NCHR to replace Fayek and President Abdel Fattah el-Sisi approved her nomination as well the new composition of NCHR. 

anizations, such as the Cairo Institute for Human Rights Studies, have expressed skepticism for the NCHR's affiliation with the Shura Council and the government's role in selecting members in the organization. In its 2009 Human Rights Report on Egypt, the United States State Department described the NCHR as a "consultative subsidiary of the Shura Council," but recognized that the NCHR's 2008/2009 annual report highlighted the human rights abuses by the Egyptian government, such as the imposition of a state of emergency, mistreatment of arrested citizens, weak counterterrorism laws, and restrictions on political parties and NGOs.

In 2007, the NCHR accused the Egyptian government of fraud during a national referendum. With Egyptian opposition groups urging citizens to boycott the referendum, the NCHR reported that the Egyptian government forced public workers to vote and restricted access to polling station from outside monitors. The Egyptian government reported that 75.9% voted for the constitutional amendments, although only 27% of voters participated in the referendum.

In 2008, the NCHR investigated the incidents at the Monastery of Saint Fana and highlighted the event in a report focused on the increase in sectarian violence in Egypt.

In the aftermath of the ouster of former president Hosni Mubarak, a committee organized by the NCHR found Mubarak, former interior minister Habib el-Adly, and others in the National Democratic Party responsible for the deaths of peaceful protesters during the uprisings preceding Mubarak's resignation. However, this report was met with criticism from those who believe that Mubarak should be held criminally, in addition to politically, responsible for violence against protesters

See also
 Human rights in Egypt
 Persecution of Copts

References

External links
 Cairo Institute for Human Rights Studies

National Council for Human Rights (Egypt)
Human rights organisations based in Egypt
2003 establishments in Egypt
Government agencies of Egypt